Cephalocrotonopsis is a genus of plant of the family Euphorbiaceae first described as a genus in 1910. It contains only one known species, Cephalocrotonopsis socotranus, endemic to the Socotra Islands in the Indian Ocean, part of the Republic of Yemen.

The species is listed as vulnerable.

References

Epiprineae
Endemic flora of Socotra
Monotypic Euphorbiaceae genera
Vulnerable plants
Taxa named by Isaac Bayley Balfour
Taxa named by Ferdinand Albin Pax
Taxobox binomials not recognized by IUCN